Joshua Steele (born 15 January 1989) better known by his stage name Flux Pavilion, is an English EDM producer, DJ, singer-songwriter and label owner who has been performing since 2008.

Flux Pavilion has headlined three US tours, two UK tours, and several festival DJ sets, including Glastonbury, Reading, Coachella, and EDC Vegas. He has also made live performances with Example, Foreign Beggars and Chiddy Bang. Flux Pavilion has said his style is inspired by The Prodigy and Rusko.

Career

2009–2010 
Flux Pavilion co-founded Circus Records along with childhood friend Doctor P, in 2009 with the backing of D&B pioneer DJ Swan-E and Earl Falconer of UB40. In 2010, Flux Pavilion released Lines In Wax containing one of his most popular tracks "I Can't Stop".

2011–2012 
In 2011 he produced the single "Bass Cannon", which peaked at number 56 on the UK Singles Chart, and was placed on the Radio 1 A-List. Along with Doctor P, Flux Pavilion presented the 2011 compilation album Circus One, to which he contributed four tracks. He is arguably best known for his song "I Can't Stop" from the Lines in Wax EP. In February 2011, Chiddy Bang created a freestyle to the song, which has appeared on their Peanut Butter and Swelly mixtape. In August 2011, the track was sampled by producer Shama "Sak Pase" Joseph for the song "Who Gon Stop Me" by Jay-Z and Kanye West on their collaborative album Watch the Throne. On 5 March 2012, "I Can't Stop" was used in the viral Kony 2012 campaign. It was also featured in the 2012 video game SSX, the 2013 film The Great Gatsby and the trailer for Ron Howard's 2013 film Rush starring Chris Hemsworth.

In December 2011, Flux Pavilion was nominated for the BBC's Sound of 2012 poll, as one of only two independent artists on the longlist. Flux Pavilion has also sung on multiple tracks for both himself and other artists, including "Voscillate", "Starlight" and "The Scientist".

2013 
On 28 January 2013, he released his new EP, Blow the Roof, which was received generally favorably by critics. One of his songs, "Double Edge", is featured in the 2012 video game Need for Speed: Most Wanted. On 8 September 2013, Steele announced a new EP to be released in October. Released on 11 November 2013, the Freeway EP consists of his big hit "Gold Love", which features the vocals of Rosie Oddie, in addition to other featured artists Steve Aoki and Turin Brakes.

2014–present 
In September 2014, Flux Pavilion was asked by The Walt Disney Company to remix the theme to Star Wars Rebels in order to market and draw attention to the series. In 2015, Flux Pavilion released his debut studio album Tesla. In 2021, Flux Pavilion released his second studio album .wav.

Discography 

  Tesla (2015)
  .wav (2021)

Awards and nominations

References 

 
Living people
Moombahcore musicians
English record producers
English DJs
Dubstep musicians
1989 births
People from Towcester
Progressive house musicians
Electronic dance music DJs
Monstercat artists